The men's pole vault event at the 1966 British Empire and Commonwealth Games was held on 13 August at the Independence Park in Kingston, Jamaica.

Results

References

Athletics at the 1966 British Empire and Commonwealth Games
1966